Robert Edward Chambliss (January 14, 1904 – October 29, 1985), also known as Dynamite Bob, was a white supremacist terrorist convicted in 1977 of murder for his role as conspirator in the 16th Street Baptist Church bombing in 1963. A member of the United Klans of America, Chambliss also firebombed the houses of several African American families in Alabama.

Investigation and conviction
A May 13, 1965 memo to Federal Bureau of Investigation (FBI) director J. Edgar Hoover identified Chambliss, Bobby Frank Cherry, Herman Frank Cash and Thomas Edwin Blanton Jr. as suspects in the 16th Street Baptist Church bombing that killed four young African-American girls.

The investigation was originally closed in 1968; no charges were filed. Years later it was found that the FBI had accumulated evidence against the named suspects that had not been revealed to the prosecutors by order of J. Edgar Hoover. Edgar Hoover stopped and shut down the investigation in 1968. The files were used by Alabama attorney general Bill Baxley to reopen the case in 1971. In 1977 Chambliss was convicted of murder for the bombing and sentenced to several terms of life imprisonment. He died in Lloyd Noland Hospital and Health Center in Birmingham on October 29, 1985, still proclaiming his innocence. He was 81.

Chambliss served his sentence in a prison near Montgomery, Alabama.

References

Further reading

See also

African-American history
Civil Rights Movement
Birmingham campaign
Mass racial violence in the United States

1904 births
1985 deaths
1963 murders in the United States
20th-century American criminals
American people convicted of murder
American truck drivers
American murderers of children
American prisoners sentenced to life imprisonment
American people who died in prison custody
Criminals from Alabama
Prisoners sentenced to life imprisonment by Alabama
Prisoners who died in Alabama detention
People convicted of murder by Alabama
History of Birmingham, Alabama
People from Birmingham, Alabama
American mass murderers
American Ku Klux Klan members